The 2018–19 ISU Challenger Series was held from August to December 2018. It was the fifth season of a group of senior-level international figure skating competitions ranked below the Grand Prix series.

Events 
The 2018–19 series will be composed of ten events.

Medal summary

Medalists

Men

Ladies

Pairs

Ice dancing

Medal standings

Challenger Series rankings 
The ISU Challenger Series rankings were formed by combining the two highest final scores of each skater or duo.

Men

Ladies

Pairs

Ice dancing

Top scores

Men

Best total score

Best short program score

Best free skating score

Ladies

Best total score

Best short program score

Best free skating score

Pairs

Best total score

Best short program score

Best free skating score

Ice dancing

Best total score

Best rhythm dance score

Best free dance score

References

External links 
 ISU Challenger Series at the International Skating Union

Challenger
2018